Arabsiyo is  a town in the Gabiley district of Somaliland. The town is located about 30 km west of Hargeisa.

Overview
Arabsiyo has a three valleys located on the West, Central and on the Eastern of the city with a number of farming villages such as Huluq, Agamsa, Gogol-wanaag, Beeyo-Qalooce, Dhagaxmadoobe, Biyomacaan, Laas Xadhaadh and Gogeysa towards Gabiley city.

Demographics 
Arabsiyo city has a total population of around 22,500 inhabitants and is primarily inhabited by the Jibril Abokor (Baha Omar and Bahabar Adan) and Hussein Abokor (Bah Gobo)  and Abdalla Abokor (Reer Galool) sub divisions of the Sa'ad Musa subclan of the Habar Awal Isaaq.

Education 
Primary schools and Secondary schools are available throughout the district.[5]

Primary schools

 Number of Primary Schools – 12

Secondary schools

 Number of Secondary Schools – 2

Climate 
The climate here is considered to be a local steppe climate. There is consistent precipitation in Arabsiyo. According to Köppen-Geiger system, this climate is classified as (BSh). In Arabsiyo, the average annual temperature is 21.4 °C. The average annual rainfall is 489 mm. The driest month is December, with 2 mm of rain. In August, the precipitation reaches its peak, with an average of 91 mm. June is the warmest month of the year. The temperature in June averages 24.5 °C. At 17.6 °C on average, January is the coldest month of the year. There is a difference of 89 mm of precipitation between the driest and wettest months. The variation in annual temperature is around 6.9 °C.

See also
Administrative divisions of Somaliland
Regions of Somaliland
Districts of Somaliland

References

Populated places in Maroodi Jeex